This article contains the entire filmography of Gemini Ganesan.

Films

Television

Notes

References

Bibliography 
 </ref>

External links 
 

Male actor filmographies
Indian filmographies